Retribution is the second studio album by Florida death metal band Malevolent Creation. It was produced and engineered by Scott Burns. The opening song, "Eve of the Apocalypse", contains the theme music from the 1986 controversial psychological horror/crime film, Henry: Portrait of a Serial Killer.

Track listing

Personnel
Malevolent Creation
 Bret Hoffmann - vocals
 Rob Barrett - lead guitar
 Phil Fasciana - rhythm guitar
 Jason Blachowicz - bass
 Alex Marquez - drums

Guest musicians
 James Murphy - guest guitar solo on "Coronation of Our Domain"

Production
 Scott Burns - engineer, producer, mixing
 Mark Gruber - assistant engineer
 Mike Fuller - mastering

Artwork
 Mark Douglas - photography
 Dan Seagrave - cover art
 Jeff "Big Jeff" Juszkiewicz - logo
 Jason Blachowicz - logo

Additional staff
 Monte Conner - A&R
 Mitchell Karduna - booking
 Scott Hecker - management

Malevolent Creation albums
1992 albums
Albums produced by Scott Burns (record producer)
Albums with cover art by Dan Seagrave
Roadrunner Records albums